The 1988 Eagle Pro Box Lacrosse League season is the 2nd season of the Eagle Pro Box Lacrosse, that began on January 3, 1988, and concluded with the championship game on March 20. On May 15, 1988 the league was renamed Major Indoor Lacrosse League (MILL), a name the league would keep for the next ten years.

Team movement
No teams were added, removed, or relocated for the 1988 season.

Regular season

Playoffs

Awards

Statistics leaders
Bold numbers indicate new single-season records. Italics indicate tied single-season records.

See also
 1988 in sports
 1988 Philadelphia Wings

References
1988 Archive at the Outsider's Guide to the NLL

88
Lacrosse